The Mumbai Gladiators are a professional American football team based in Mumbai, India. The Gladiators are one of the first eight franchises of the Elite Football League of India (EFLI) and compete in its inaugural season in 2012 as a member of the West Division.

The team's debut match incidentally is the league's first match as well. The Gladiators began their season by playing against the Pune Marathas in November 2012.

References

Elite Football League of India
American football teams in India
American football teams established in 2011
Sport in Mumbai
2011 establishments in Maharashtra